Voyager Point is a small suburb, in South Western Sydney in the state of New South Wales, Australia. Voyager Point is located 25 kilometres (35 min) south of the Sydney central business district, in the local government area of the City of Liverpool. The only adjacent suburbs are Sandy Point, Holsworthy and Pleasure Point. Milperra, Panania and East Hills are located on the opposite bank of the Georges River.

History
Voyager Point takes its name from the commemorative park which was established following the loss of HMAS Voyager with the loss of 82 lives after the destroyer collided with the aircraft carrier HMAS Melbourne in February 1964. This area was formerly the East Hills Naval Estate, which contained about 70 married quarters for families of members in the Royal Australian Navy. This suburb also housed refugees from 1954 many of whom who had fled concentration and refugee camps in Australia.

Heritage listings
Voyager Point has a number of heritage-listed sites, including:
 Creekwood Reserve: Lucas Watermills Archaeological Sites

Landmarks
The area includes many native flora, fauna and walkways through the bushland areas. A footbridge across the Georges River connects the suburb to East Hills, near Henry Lawson Drive. The Avenue is the only access road into the suburb from Heathcote Road.

Streets
The original streets in the suburb, such as Torch and Pelorus, were named after ships of the Second Fleet. The suburb is a relatively new development by Delfin Lend Lease on land formerly belonging to Holsworthy Barracks. A 2nd development was released in the early 2010s released by Defence Housing Australia in the North West Corner.

References

Suburbs of Sydney
City of Liverpool (New South Wales)